Dragan Vučić (6 September 1955 – 4 May 2020) was a Macedonian composer, singer, bass guitar player,  philanthropist and TV host.

His most famous songs are "Nika Nika", "Odlazim (Nikom nije nocas kao meni)", translation: "I'm going away (Nobody feels like me tonight)".

Dragan was born in Skopje, Yugoslavia, but today in North Macedonia. Dragan composed numerous pop hits such as Svirete Ja Zajdi Zajdi, Angeli Me Nosat , Kaži Zvezdo and many more. In the 1980s he was a singer and bass guitar player of pop-folk band Tavce Gravce, and in the 1990s he was the lead singer and bass guitar player of the pop-folk band Koda. He composed the song Make My Day, chosen to represent Macedonia in the Eurovision Song Contest 2005. Later in his career from 1996 until 2020 he started hosting various TV shows on many TV channels in Macedonia.

Death
Vučić suffered from complications after contracting COVID-19 during the COVID-19 pandemic in North Macedonia in April 2020. He died on 4 May 2020, in the infectious clinic in Skopje, aged 65.

References

External links
 

1955 births
2020 deaths
Macedonian pop singers
Musicians from Skopje
Macedonian people of Serbian descent
20th-century Macedonian male singers
Yugoslav male singers
Deaths from the COVID-19 pandemic in North Macedonia